Patrick Anthony Meehan (born June 29, 1948) is a British record producer, who is best known to have worked with English heavy metal band Black Sabbath until he was fired in 1975 by the band.

Meehan founded Worldwide Artiste Management at No. 4 Leicester Street, London, in 1970 along with his father (also called Patrick), Wilf Pine and Malcolm Koss. Meehan Sr was a former stuntman who had roadied for Gene Vincent and worked with Small Faces manager Don Arden. As well as Black Sabbath, the group managed the progressive rock band Gentle Giant (remnants of 1960s pop band Simon Dupree and the Big Sound), Snafu (featuring original Procol Harum drummer Bobby Harrison), Black Widow, the Dutch band Cobra, Catapilla, Redbone and Mama Lion.

The company was listed on the London Stock Exchange in late 1970 after Black Sabbath became commercially successful. In 1971, Worldwide Artiste Management merged with Hemdale Ltd (named after founders, actors David Hemmings and John Daley) and moved to Mayfair. In 1973 Meehan launched the World Wide Artists (WWA) record label, which released albums by Black Sabbath, Gentle Giant, Snafu and The Groundhogs, with distribution by Phonogram. After 36 releases, the company closed in 1975.

Meehan fell out with Black Sabbath in the late 1970s after a commercial and critical slump, and branched out into other areas of the entertainment business. He acquired HandMade Films in the late 1990s, becoming its executive chairman.

References

British record producers
Living people
Year of birth missing (living people)